Anna Callebaut (born 11 August 1962) is a former Belgian racing cyclist. She finished in third place in the Belgian National Road Race Championships in 1982 and 1983.

References

External links

1962 births
Living people
Belgian female cyclists
Sportspeople from Aalst, Belgium
Cyclists from East Flanders